Unemployment in France discusses the causes and measures of French unemployment and strategies for reducing it.

Pôle emploi appeared in 2008.

France's unemployment rate increased to 8.60 % in September 2019, from the previously reported number of 8.50 % in June of the same year.

In October 2020, Deutsche Welle reported that unemployment among Muslims in France was far higher at 14%, than the population at large (8%).

References

 
France